"There's a Love Knot in My Lariat" (also sp. "There's a Love-Knot in My Lariat") is a song written and originally recorded by Canadian singer Wilf Carter (a.k.a. Montana Slim). It is considered one of his signature tunes and was inducted into the Canadian Songwriters Hall of Fame in 2007.

History 
Wilf Carter wrote this song in 1937. He recorded it on March 11, 1937, and released it on a 78-r.p.m. record (c/w "My Little Yoho Lady", Bluebird B 4619) in the same year.

Lyrics 
According to the song's profile on the Canadian Songwriters Hall of Fame website, it is "an honest expression of his feelings for his future wife and muse, Bobbie Bryan, and his longing for his Alberta prairie life".

Slim Whitman version 

Slim Whitman's rendition had a single release in the UK in December 1956 (London HL 8350, as the flip to "I'm Casting My Lasso Towards the Sky").

Track listing

Other covers 
In addition to Whitman, Alberta Slim, Frank Ifield, Judy Coder and Pride of the Prairie, Randy Hollar, Roger Tibbs, Brett Kissel, Teresa Endres are among the other artists who covered the song.

References 

1937 songs
Wilf Carter songs
Slim Whitman songs
1937 singles
1956 singles
Bluebird Records singles
London Records singles
Songs written by Wilf Carter
1948 singles
RCA Victor singles